Tiffani Silva Marinho (born 6 May 1999) is a Brazilian athlete. She competed in the mixed 4 × 400 metres relay event at the 2019 World Athletics Championships. She competed at the 2020 Summer Olympics.

Silva Marinho won the gold medal in 4×400 m relay mixed relays and bronze in 400 m during the 2021 Junior Pan American Games held in Cali, Colombia.

Personal bests
400 m: 51.51 s – Rio de Janeiro, Brazil, 23 Jun 2022

All information from World Athletics profile.

References

External links

1999 births
Living people
Brazilian female sprinters
Place of birth missing (living people)
World Athletics Championships athletes for Brazil
South American Championships in Athletics winners
Troféu Brasil de Atletismo winners
Athletes (track and field) at the 2020 Summer Olympics
Olympic athletes of Brazil
Olympic female sprinters
21st-century Brazilian women